Keenwild is a musical duo formed by Jeney Kingsbury and Bill Gould, in late 2002, that has performed at many venues across the western United States. Keenwild is based in Temecula California.

Group formation
Keenwild formed from Superdank, a band featuring Jason Walker on guitar, that broke up in early 2002.  Their final show, played in Hemet, California at The Wheelhouse, had Bill Gould singing as he fell off the stage into the crowd. Walker went on to play guitar in the Heavy Metal band Serpent Underground after leaving Superdank. Gould had been writing songs that were not at all in the style of Superdank in the spring of 2002. When he met Kingsbury in late 2001 through a message board on the website of now defunct radio station 92.1 in San Diego, the two became friends. On the way home from a Superdank show in February 2002 at Brick by Brick in San Diego, Gould heard Kingsbury singing to the radio in the back seat and knew he had found the new lead singer for his untitled new project.

Finding a name
After beginning to write new songs together, the duo knew that the name Superdank was not the correct one for this new and different project. While driving to one of Gould's favorite hiking locations in Idyllwild, California, the pair were writing down random ideas when they drove past an area of the forest named 'Keenwild' and wrote down that name as well and eventually chose it.

Success
In late 2004, the Keenwild song "Mr Pete" went to number one on the Australian MP3.com.au chart. The song "Rivers" made it to the top 10 in the spring of 2005. Keenwild enjoyed playing the grand opening of the Temecula Dippin' Dots store that was headlined by A Change Of Pace, during the show Gould played with a broken hand until his cast broke all of the strings making it impossible to perform further.

The band, thru extensive touring, has played venues such as Modified Arts, The Electric Theater (St. George, Utah), Ridglea Theater (Fort Worth, Texas), Java Joz (Murrieta, California), Madlins (Temecula, Ca), Temecula CRC (Temecula, Ca), Water Canyon Coffee (Yucca, Ca), Beatnik Cafe (Joshua Tree, Ca), Zia Records (Tempe, Az), Santa Fe Cafe (Fullerton, Ca) The Dirt (Las Cruces, Nm) and The Boondocks (Cedar City, Ut).
In early 2005, Keenwild played a sold out show in St George, Utah, at the Electric Theater with bands A Thorn For Every Heart and Brown Eyed Deception, the latter of whom changed their name to YouInSeries after this show.

In 2014, Keenwild was nominated for two Temecula Valley Music Awards and won the award for Viewers Choice, for the song "Seventeen".

After almost ten years since the last album was out, a new album Sunsets was released in January 2015 on iTunes, Amazon and other digital outlets.

Keenwild have played shows with well-known bands such as Neon Trees, Meg and Dia, HelloGoodbye, Steel Train, Inverse, A Change Of Pace, YouInSeries, D.O.R.K./Animo, Halifax, Socratic, An Angle and Limbeck.

The band has also played events like Temecula Arts Festival, Earth Day at Lake Skinner, Idyllwild Strong Festival, Temecula Bluegrass Festival, Temecula Rod Run, Redlands Race for the Cure, Temecula Tractor Race, Think Pink - a Breast Cancer Benefit, Temecula Music Fest, and Rancho Damicitas Group Home Kids Concert.

Other interests
Bill and Jeney began promoting shows in the Temecula area in 2004 at various local venues as a way to entertain high school kids.  The shows have been successful and have led to them starting the Temecula Music Fest and a weekly concert series at the local theater, The Merc.

After the success in hosting live music and playing shows across the country with Keenwild, Gould decided to run for elected office in the fall of 2007. In his first campaign and running against a former District Trustee, Bill won the election and now sits on the Romoland School Board as a Trustee.

The fall of 2010 found Jeney Kingsbury being elected to the Board of Directors of the Temecula Arts Council. Jeney currently serves as the Secretary on the Executive Board.

In early 2011, Bill Gould and Jeney Kingsbury (Full Value Entertainment) sold the Temecula Music Fest to The Vault, a local Temecula concert producer. Bill and Jeney continued on as an important part of the event, Keenwild played the opening night.

On July 1, 2011, after four years as a Trustee, Bill Gould stepped down as a Board Member of the Romoland School District. Bill cited 'personal reasons' as his reason for resigning, fueling speculation of him seeking higher office in 2012. The official reason given to the Press-Enterprise was to spend more time with the family.

At the start of Keenwild's set at the 2011 Temecula Music Fest, Bill told the crowd to register to vote (and actually vote), volunteer in the community and help lead the country; before declaring his freedom from the confines of being an elected official and tearing into an unedited version of the Keenwild hit "Mr Pete". This was the first time in over four years that Keenwild had played the song live.

Line-up
Jeney Kingsbury: vocals, keyboards
Bill Gould: Guitar, Bass, Programming

Other contributors
Kravvy: vocals
Apryl Gould: piano
Alex Pappas: percussion
Devin Sanchez: drums, percussion
Jason Walker: guitar, bass, percussion
Artistic Propaganda: laptop
EC: MC
JS Free: MC
Gilbert: drums
Peter: Bass

Discography

Studio albums
Sunrise (2020)
Sunsets {remastered with bonus tracks} (2020)
Fate (2018)
Sunsets (2015)
The Long Road Home (2005)
Dievercity (2003)

Demos
"Closer" (2002 CD single)

References

External links
Official website

American folk musical groups
Musical groups from Riverside County, California
Musical groups established in 2002
People from Temecula, California
2002 establishments in California